Oscar Otte was the defending champion but retired in the quarterfinals to Elias Ymer.

Carlos Taberner won the title after defeating Manuel Guinard 6–2, 6–2 in the final.

Seeds

Draw

Finals

Top half

Bottom half

References

External links
Main draw
Qualifying draw

Open du Pays d'Aix - 1
2021 Singles